ABBA Gold: Greatest Hits is a compilation album by the Swedish pop group ABBA. It was released on 21 September 1992 through PolyGram, making it the first compilation to be released after the company had acquired Polar Music, and thus the rights to the ABBA back catalogue.

With sales of 30 million, Gold is the best-selling ABBA album, as well one of the best-selling albums worldwide. Since 1992, it has been re-released several times, most notably in 1999 as the first remastered reissue to mark the group's 25th anniversary of winning the Eurovision Song Contest 1974, in 2008 to coincide with the release of the film Mamma Mia! and most recently in 2014 to mark the group's 40th anniversary of winning the Eurovision Song Contest.

Background and overview
Polar had only produced and distributed ABBA's records in Scandinavian countries, licencing the recordings for release by different companies around the world (such as Atlantic in the US and Epic in the UK). This meant there were many different compilations released in different parts of the world. As these licences were renewed every three years, between 1989 (when PolyGram acquired Polar) and 1992 all of these licences had expired. Although PolyGram had made all of the original studio albums available (along with the 1986 live album which had originally been issued by Polydor worldwide), all previously released ABBA compilations had been deleted. Erasure had released a 4 track ABBA cover EP, Abba-esque, in summer 1992 which topped charts around the world showing there was still a strong interest in ABBA's music. Rather than issue the multiple previous compilations, PolyGram put together a new collection, optimised for the CD format.

Gold: Greatest Hits was well received by the music-buying public, and went on to be one of the best-selling albums of all time. It has been re-released in various "special" or "remastered" releases:

Regional variations and tie-ins

Australasian editions
The 1992 and 1999 editions released in Australia and New Zealand (and some other territories in that area) had a modified track listing (see below) to include three local hits, replacing three other songs on the international edition.

The 2002 re-release was not released in Australia, while in New Zealand, the international edition was issued.

From 2008 onwards, only the international editions have been released in Australia and New Zealand.

Spanish versions
The original 1992 release had a slightly different track listing, replacing the English versions of "Chiquitita" and "Fernando" with the Spanish language versions.

Shortly after the release of Gold: Greatest Hits, a Spanish version of the album, titled Oro: Grandes Exitos was issued, followed later by Mas Oro: Mas Grandes Exitos.

Video and DVD
In 1992 a VHS video was released which included all tracks from the original album. During the 1990s, various regional variations on this video were issued, until Universal Music decided in 2003 to re-issue the video on VHS and DVD. The track listing was similar to the original album, with some added content: a 25-minute documentary produced in 1999, and the 1992 video of "Dancing Queen". 
In 2010, the DVD was remastered with six bonus clips, including five "split-screen" versions of the clips to show which improvements were made by remastering the old videos. These "split-screen" clips were "Gimme! Gimme! Gimme!", "Mamma Mia", "Dancing Queen", "The Winner Takes It All" and "Money, Money, Money". The sixth bonus clip was an Australian cartoon version of "Money, Money, Money". The 2010 edition did not include the 2003 ABBA documentary or the 1992 version of "Dancing Queen". This disc was available as a stand-alone DVD and as part of the 2010 'Special Edition' re-release.

Other variations
In 2002, Gold: Greatest Hits was released in mainland Europe (though not in the UK) with a bonus second disc.

The UK saw a 30th Anniversary Edition released in 2004 with a gold-coloured sleeve cover with black writing, rather than the normal black sleeve with gold writing. The original release included a DVD with 18 of the 19 songs from the CD, excluding "The Name of the Game". It is also available without the DVD.

Commercial performance
With pure sales of 5.61 million copies, Gold: Greatest Hits is the second-highest selling album of all time in the United Kingdom, after Queen's Greatest Hits. In August, 2019, Gold: Greatest Hits became the longest-running top 100 album of all time, spending 900 weeks on the UK Albums Chart. The album spent 61 (non-consecutive) weeks in the top 10 and topped the British chart 5 times, most recently for two weeks in 2008 following release of the motion picture Mamma Mia!. As of July 2021, "Gold" became the first album to reach 1000 weeks on the Official Charts in United Kingdom with pure sales of 5.61 million copies sold in United Kingdom. In November 2021, it was awarded 20× Platinum by the British Phonographic Industry, denoting six millions album-equivalent unit in the UK. 

In the United States, the album has sold a total of 5.8 million copies and is the nineteenth biggest-selling greatest-hits album in the Nielsen Music era (which began in 1991). In Canada, Gold: Greatest Hits achieved Diamond status (one million units sold) in May, 2000.

In Germany, Gold: Greatest Hits has been certified five times Platinum for shipment of 2.5 million units. It has also been certified 10 times Platinum in Switzerland for sales of 500,000 units. In Austria, the album charted for 397 weeks, making it the all-time second longest stay on the chart. After reaching catalogue status, it returned to the top 10 three times, twice in the wake of the releases of Mamma Mia! The Movie Soundtrack and Mamma Mia! Here We Go Again and once due to the release of a special edition.

Critical reception

Gold: Greatest Hits has been called one of the most influential compilation albums ever released. Music critic Elisabeth Vincentelli (New York Post; Time Out New York) credits the album for a revival of critical interest in ABBA's music after ten years of neglect following the band's 1982 break-up.

Writing for Pitchfork in 2019, reviewer Jamieson Cox agreed, describing Gold: Greatest Hits as a "refined package with surprising emotional range". The album, he wrote, "capitalized on a simmering, subcultural interest in ABBA’s work and sparked a full-blown revival" that culminated in the Mamma Mia! stage and film productions.

BuzzFeed music editor Matthew Perpetua included Gold: Greatest Hits among the compilations he considered "so well curated in presenting a fertile period of a career that they are arguably an artist's definitive work".

Former Rolling Stone magazine writer Tom Moon included Gold: Greatest Hits among his 1,000 Recordings to Hear Before You Die, describing the tracks as "models of impeccable craft", adding that the album is "an excellent starter kit for those wanting to investigate the DNA of post-Beatles pop."

Writing for Vanity Fair, singer-songwriter Elvis Costello included Gold: Greatest Hits among his list of 500 essential albums.

Track listings
All tracks are produced by Benny Andersson and Björn Ulvaeus.

2014 40th Anniversary Edition bonus tracks

Personnel

Agnetha Fältskog - vocals
Anni-Frid Lyngstad - vocals
Björn Ulvaeus - Steel-string, acoustic guitar, vocals 
 Benny Andersson – synthesizer, keyboards, vocals

Production
 Benny Andersson, Björn Ulvaeus – producers
 Michael B. Tretow – engineer, digital remastering (1992 edition)
 Jon Astley – digital remastering (1999, 2002, 2004 reissues)
 Henrik Jonsson – digital remastering (2008 reissue)
 Ingemar Bergman – compilation
 Chris Griffin – compilation
 George McManus – compilation
 Jackie Stansfield – compilation
 John Tobler – liner notes, compilation
 Carl Magnus Palm – liner notes (1999, 2002, 2004, 2008 reissues)

Charts

Weekly charts

Year-end charts

Decade-end charts

Certifications and sales

See also

 List of best-selling albums
 List of best-selling albums by country
 List of best-selling albums in Australia
 List of best-selling albums in Austria
 List of best-selling albums in Europe
 List of best-selling albums in France
 List of best-selling albums in Finland
 List of best-selling albums in Germany
 List of best-selling albums in New Zealand
 List of best-selling albums in Switzerland
 List of best-selling albums in the United Kingdom

References

External links
 abba4therecord / Webpage showing Gold Releases worldwide

Further reading
 ABBA Gold by Elisabeth Vincentelli – in 2004.
 Elisabeth Vincentelli: Abba Gold. In: David Barker (ed.): 33 1/3 Greatest Hits. Bloomsbury Publishing, 2006, pp. 87-96.

1992 greatest hits albums
ABBA compilation albums
PolyGram compilation albums
Albums recorded at Polar Studios
Albums produced by Björn Ulvaeus
Albums produced by Benny Andersson